The 1905 Norwegian Football Cup was the fourth season of the Norwegian annual knockout football tournament. The tournament was open for 1905 local association leagues (kretsserier) champions, except in Kristiania og omegn where a separate cup qualifying tournament was held. Odd won their third consecutive title.

Semi-finals

|colspan="3" style="background-color:#97DEFF"|9 September 1905

|}

Final

References

External links
RSSSF Football Archive

Norwegian Football Cup seasons
Norway
Football Cup